Kyoto Jazz Massive is a Japanese musical project specialising in crossover jazz and electronic styles. The group was formed in 1994 and consists of brothers Shuya and Yoshihiro Okino. They have also included Hajime Yoshizawa, a piano producer, on a number of works. Although the brothers DJed in the late 1980s and were remixing and composing as far back as the early 1990s, they were largely popularised by the British Radio 1 DJ Gilles Peterson around 2001.

Background
Brothers Shuya and Yoshihiro Okino, both DJs and remixers in Kyoto, formed the project in 1994. They released their debut album, Spirit of the Sun, in 2002.
In 2015, to celebrate their 20-year anniversary, the duo put together a full jazz band, titled Kyoto Jazz Sextet. Their debut album, Unity, came out in 2017.

Shuya Okino also runs a music venue in Shibuya, Tokyo, called The Room.

Discography

Kyoto Jazz Massive
Studio albums
 Spirit of the Sun (2002)
 Message from a New Dawn (2021)

EPs
 Kyoto Jazz Massive (1994)

Singles
 "Mind Expansions" (2002)

Compilations
 Kyoto Jazz Massive (1994)
 Fueled for the Future (2000)
 Crossbreed (2000)
 Crossbreed 2 (2001)
 Re KJM (2004)
 For KJM (2004)
 By KJM (2005)
 10th Anniversary (2006)

Kyoto Jazz Sextet
 Unity (2017)

See also
 Japanese jazz

References

External links
 
 Shuya Okino blog
 The Room official website
 

Japanese electronic music groups
Japanese dance music groups
Compost Records artists
Musical groups from Kyoto Prefecture